Rolf Einar Pedersen (born 4 November 1969) is a Norwegian ice sledge hockey player.

As a member of the Norwegian ice sledge hockey team he has one bronze (2010), and two silver (2002, 2006) from the Paralympic Games. Many consider him to be the best ice sledge hockey player in the sport's history.

He has two Paralympic bronze (1988), and one silver (1988) from ice sledge speed racing, and one gold (1992) from cross-country skiing.

References

External links
 
 

1969 births
Living people
Norwegian sledge hockey players
Norwegian male cross-country skiers
Paralympic sledge hockey players of Norway
Paralympic ice sledge speed racers of Norway
Paralympic cross-country skiers of Norway
Ice sledge speed racers at the 1988 Winter Paralympics
Cross-country skiers at the 1992 Winter Paralympics
Ice sledge hockey players at the 2002 Winter Paralympics
Ice sledge hockey players at the 2006 Winter Paralympics
Ice sledge hockey players at the 2010 Winter Paralympics
Ice sledge hockey players at the 2014 Winter Paralympics
Paralympic gold medalists for Norway
Paralympic silver medalists for Norway
Paralympic bronze medalists for Norway
Medalists at the 1988 Winter Paralympics
Medalists at the 1992 Winter Paralympics
Medalists at the 2002 Winter Paralympics
Medalists at the 2006 Winter Paralympics
Medalists at the 2010 Winter Paralympics
Paralympic medalists in sledge hockey